Athis flavimaculata is a moth in the Castniidae family. It is found in Costa Rica and the Mexican states of Morelos and Guerrero.

Physical description
The length of the forewings is 40–53 mm for males and 56–65 mm for females. The upperside, head and thorax are brown and the abdomen fulvous. The underside of the head, palpi, thorax and abdomen is pale yellow on the inner margins. The forewings are reddish tan with warm brown markings on the upperside. The upperside of the hindwings is bright orange with a yellow extradiscal spotband. The underside of the forewings is warm brown halfway up the costa, but shading to yellow toward apex. The margin is reddish tan. The underside of the hindwings is pale orange with golden orange along the anal margin and reddish brown halfway along the costa shading to tannish white along the remainder of the costa and margin. The head, thorax and abdomen of the females are slightly darker than in the males. The ground colour is yellowish tan with dark brown markings as in male, but darker and more extensive.

References

Moths described in 1972
Castniidae